In enzymology, a L-seryl-tRNASec selenium transferase is an enzyme that catalyzes the chemical reaction

L-seryl-tRNASec + selenophosphate  L-selenocysteinyl-tRNASec + phosphate

Thus, the two substrates of this enzyme are L-seryl-tRNASec and selenophosphate, whereas its two products are L-selenocysteinyl-tRNASec and phosphate.

This enzyme belongs to the family of transferases, specifically those transferring selenium-containing groups selenotransferases.  The systematic name of this enzyme class is selenophosphate:L-seryl-tRNASec selenium transferase. Other names in common use include L-selenocysteinyl-tRNASel synthase, L-selenocysteinyl-tRNASec synthase selenocysteine synthase, cysteinyl-tRNASec-selenium transferase, and cysteinyl-tRNASec-selenium transferase.  This enzyme participates in selenoamino acid metabolism.  It employs one cofactor, pyridoxal phosphate.

References

 

EC 2.9.1
Pyridoxal phosphate enzymes
Enzymes of unknown structure